Sir Andrew Caradoc Hamilton, 10th Baronet (born 23 September 1953) is an English former first-class cricketer.

The son of Sir Robert Hamilton, he was born in September 1953 at Ardingly, Sussex. He was educated at Charterhouse School, before going up to St Peter's College, Oxford. While studying at Oxford, he played first-class cricket for Oxford University, making his debut against Derbyshire at Oxford in 1975. Hamilton played first-class cricket for Oxford until 1976, making twelve appearances. He scored a total of 308 runs in his twelve matches, at an average of 12.83 and a high score of 45. He succeeded his father as the 10th Baronet of the Hamilton baronets upon his death in September 2001.

References

External links

1953 births
Living people
People from Ardingly
People educated at Charterhouse School
Alumni of St Peter's College, Oxford
English cricketers
Oxford University cricketers
Baronets in the Baronetage of Nova Scotia